The tribe Anthocharini is one of the subdivisions of the insect order Lepidoptera, which includes the moths and butterflies. It is a further subdivision of the butterfly family Pieridae and subfamily Pierinae; formerly it was considered a subfamily on its own, Anthocharinae. This tribe includes many, but not all, of the orangetip butterflies.

Some notable species and subspecies of tribe Anthocharini include: 	
 Catalina orangetip (Anthocharis cethura catalina)
 Desert orangetip (Anthocharis cethura cethura)
 Eastern dappled white (Euchloe ausonia)
 Eastern greenish black-tip (Euchloe penia)
 Eastern orange tip (Anthocharis damone)
 Falcate orangetip (Anthocharis midea)
 Gray marble (Anthocharis lanceolata)
 Green-striped white (Euchloe belemia), and several subspecies
 Greenish black-tip (Euchloe charlonia)
 Grüner's orange tip (Anthocharis gruneri), and several subspecies
 Mexican orangetip (Anthocharis limonea)
 Morocco orange tip (Anthocharis belia)
 Olympia marble (Euchloe olympia)
 Orange tip (Anthocharis cardamines), and many subspecies, including A. c. phoenissa
 Portuguese dappled white (Euchloe tagis), and many subspecies, including E. t. tagis,  E. t. castellana, E. t. bellezina, E. t. reisseri and others
 Provence orange tip (Anthocharis euphenoides)
 Sara's orangetip (Anthocharis sara), and several subspecies
 Sooty orange tip (Zegris eupheme)
 Southern Rocky Mountain orangetip (Anthocharis julia)
 Southwestern orangetip (Anthocharis thoosa)
 Stella orangetip (Anthocharis stella)
 Yellow tip (Anthocharis scolymus)

References

 
Taxa named by J. W. Tutt
Butterfly tribes
Pierinae